"I Keep Coming Back" is a song written by Jim Hurt, Johnny Slate and Larry Keith, and recorded by American country music artist Razzy Bailey.  It was released in November 1980 as the fourth single from the album Razzy.  The song was Bailey's second number one on the country chart and was released as a double A-side with "True Life Country Music", with both sides spending one week at number 1.

Charts

References

1980 singles
Razzy Bailey songs
Song recordings produced by Bob Montgomery (songwriter)
RCA Records Nashville singles
Songs written by Jim Hurt
Songs written by Johnny Slate
1980 songs